Pavel Valeryevich Korobkov (born October 18, 1990) is a Russian former professional basketball player who last played for CSKA Moscow of the VTB United League and the EuroLeague.

Professional career
Korobkov grew up in the junior teams of Ural Great Perm, and last played there for their Under-23 team in the 2008–09 season. After going undrafted in the 2012 NBA draft, he signed with Russian VTB United League team Nizhny Novgorod. In his second season (2013–14), he averaged 10.5 points in the VTB United League playoffs, to lead his team to a second place finish, and its first ever EuroLeague berth.

In July 2014, Korobkov signed a three-year contract with CSKA Moscow. In his first season with the team, CSKA Moscow won the VTB United League, after eliminating Khimki with a 3–0 series sweep in the league's finals series.

Russian national team
Korobkov has been a member of the senior Russian national basketball team. He played at the EuroBasket 2015 qualification tournament.

References

External links
 Pavel Korobkov at eurobasket.com
 Pavel Korobkov at euroleague.net
 Pavel Korobkov at fiba.com
 Pavel Korobkov at vtb-league.com

1990 births
Living people
BC Nizhny Novgorod players
Centers (basketball)
PBC CSKA Moscow players
Power forwards (basketball)
Russian men's basketball players